Over She Goes is a 1937 British musical comedy film directed by Graham Cutts and starring Stanley Lupino, Claire Luce, Laddie Cliff, Gina Malo and Max Baer. It was based on a successful London stage play by Lupino, with music by Billy Mayerl. The screenplay concerns a music hall performer (John Wood) who inherits an English title and estate, and invites his friends to stay with him where they are targeted by avaricious woman hoping for a rich marriage.

Cast
 Stanley Lupino as Tommy Teacher
 Claire Luce as Pamela Ward
 Gina Malo as Dolly Jordan
 Max Baer as Silas Morner
 Laddie Cliff as Billy Bowler
 Sally Gray as Kitty
 Judy Kelly as Alice Mayhill
 John Wood as Harry, Lord  Drewsden
 Syd Walker as Inspector Giffnock
 Bertha Belmore as Ethel, The Dowager Lady Drewsden
 Richard Murdoch as Sergeant Oliver
 Fred Hearne as Lord Drewsden
 Archibald Batty as Alfred

References

External links

Over She Goes at BFI Database

1937 films
British musical comedy films
Films shot at Associated British Studios
1937 musical comedy films
Films directed by Graham Cutts
British black-and-white films
1930s English-language films
1930s British films